The Yanggakdo International Hotel is the largest operating hotel in North Korea, pending the completion of the Ryugyong Hotel, and the country's seventh- or eighth-tallest building. The hotel is located on Yanggak Island in the River Taedong,  to the south-east of the centre of Pyongyang, the nation's capital.

This hotel is North Korea's first luxury hotel,  The structure was built between 1986 and 1992 by France's Campenon Bernard Construction Company and opened in 1996.

Background
Besides housing the reception, the ground floor offers the purchase of North Korean currency sets, postcards and letters, and basic commodities at Western prices. There is a bar and a bookshop which stocks North Korean reading material including treatises of President Kim Il-sung and General Kim Jong-il.

In addition to the revolving restaurant, the hotel guide issued to guests indicates that the hotel contains four further restaurants on the second floor: dining-rooms one and two, the main banquet hall, and the Japanese, Chinese and Korean food dining-rooms.

The basement contains a bowling alley, a pool room, a sauna, a swimming pool, a barber shop, a casino, and a massage club.

The price of the hotel is $499 a night for two adults. The hotel's grounds originally included a  nine-hole golf course. In 2011 the golf course was demolished to make space for a Chinese-funded health complex to be built. Also located on Yanggak Island, next to the hotel's grounds, is the Pyongyang International Cinema Hall, one of the main venues for the Pyongyang International Film Festival. The Yanggakdo International Hotel is a standard stop on most tours of North Korea.

Fifth floor

The fifth floor of the hotel has been a source of curiosity among foreigners because it is off-limits to hotel guests. The elevators do not stop on the fifth floor; hence, there is no fifth-floor button on the elevator panel. The fifth floor has occasionally been visited "unofficially" via staircase by tourists exploring the hotel. It is reported to be further split into two separate floors, with mostly locked rooms, and is decorated with propaganda posters. Tourists have also reported seeing surveillance equipment apparently used to observe guests' rooms. One Western travel agency specialising in tours of North Korea has described the fifth floor as "actually just a service level much like would be found in any hotel, and strictly off limits to tourists."

Otto Warmbier incident
On 2 January 2016, a visiting American university student, Otto Warmbier, was arrested on a charge of attempting to steal a political propaganda banner from a restricted area of the hotel. Although some early media reports speculated that the incident had occurred on the hotel's fifth floor, Warmbier himself indicated in a confession that he took down the banner from a staff-only area of the second floor of the hotel, but abandoned the item after discovering it was too large to carry away. 
Staff members from the hotel testified against Warmbier at his trial.  On 16 March 2016, Warmbier was sentenced to 15 years' imprisonment with hard labor. After seventeen months in captivity, it was revealed that Warmbier had suffered severe brain damage, and he was brought back to the United States in June 2017, dying six days later.

Gallery

See also

Koryo Hotel
Ryugyong Hotel
List of hotels in North Korea

References

External links

The hotel's promotional video, recorded by a guest in August 2011: 
Yanggakdo International Hotel picture album at Naenara

Hotel buildings completed in 1992
Hotels in Pyongyang
Buildings and structures with revolving restaurants
Skyscrapers in North Korea
Skyscraper hotels
Hotels established in 1995
1995 establishments in North Korea
20th-century architecture in North Korea